The 2012–2013 Bryant Bulldogs men's basketball team represented Bryant University during the 2012–13 NCAA Division I men's basketball season. The team was led by fifth year head coach Tim O'Shea and played their home games at the Chace Athletic Center. They were members of the Northeast Conference. 2012–13 marked the first year Bryant was eligible to participate in NCAA division I postseason play after a four-year transition period. They finished the season 19–12, 12–6 in NEC play to finish in a three way tie for second place. They were invited to the 2013 College Basketball Invitational where they lost in the first round to Richmond.

Roster

Schedule

|-
!colspan=9|Exhibition

|-
!colspan=9|Regular Season

|-
!colspan=9| 2013 Northeast Conference men's basketball tournament

|-
!colspan=9| 2013 College Basketball Invitational

References

Bryant Bulldogs men's basketball seasons
2012–13 Northeast Conference men's basketball season
Bryant
Bryant
Bryant